The 2020 O'Reilly Auto Parts 300 was a NASCAR Xfinity Series race held on October 24, 2020. It was contested over 200 laps on the  oval. It was the thirty-first race of the 2020 NASCAR Xfinity Series season, the fifth race of the playoffs, and the second race in the Round of 8. Joe Gibbs Racing driver Harrison Burton collected his third win of the season.

Report

Background 
Texas Motor Speedway is a speedway located in the northernmost portion of the U.S. city of Fort Worth, Texas – the portion located in Denton County, Texas. The track measures 1.5 miles (2.4 km) around and is banked 24 degrees in the turns, and is of the oval design, where the front straightaway juts outward slightly. The track layout is similar to Atlanta Motor Speedway and Charlotte Motor Speedway (formerly Lowe's Motor Speedway). The track is owned by Speedway Motorsports, Inc., the same company that owns Atlanta and Charlotte Motor Speedways, as well as the short-track Bristol Motor Speedway.

Entry list 

 (R) denotes rookie driver.
 (i) denotes driver who is ineligible for series driver points.

Qualifying 
Chase Briscoe was awarded the pole based on competition based formula.

Qualifying results

Race

Race results

Stage Results 
Stage One
Laps: 45

Stage Two
Laps: 45

Final Stage Results 

Laps: 110

Race statistics 

 Lead changes: 19 among 10 different drivers
 Cautions/Laps: 10 for 51
 Time of race: 2 hours, 35 minutes, and 21 seconds
 Average speed:

References 

NASCAR races at Texas Motor Speedway
2020 in sports in Texas
O'Reilly Auto Parts 300
2020 NASCAR Xfinity Series